The second incarnation of Touchstone Television (formerly known as Fox 21 Television Studios) was an American television production company that is a subsidiary of Disney Media Networks' Walt Disney Television owned by The Walt Disney Company. It was founded in 2014 from the merger of  Fox Television Studios and Fox 21, and given its second name in mid-2020 following the acquisition of 21st Century Fox by Disney.

On December 1, 2020, Disney announced that the label was folded into 20th Television.

Predecessors

Fox Television Studios

Fox Television Studios, Inc. was a television production subsidiary of 21st Century Fox's Fox Entertainment Group, as well as being the unofficial production arm of Fox and the secondary production arm of 20th Century Fox Television, itself a division of 20th Century Fox Film Corporation.
Fox Television Studios (FTVS) was formed in 1997 alongside 20th Century Fox Television and 20th Television under executive David Grant. The studio was created to house smaller production units, starting with the Greenblatt-Janollari Studio (G-JS). Greenblatt-Janollari started producing shows in the 1998–1999 season with 3 comedy series for ABC and CBS. While funded by Fox, G-JS was presented as an "independent mini-studio". The studio also partnered with David Gerber and his Gerber Company venture to produce various telemovies and television series. With Fox Entertainment Group holding a 20% stake in New Regency Production's parent corporation, Fox Studios formed a joint venture, Regency Television, by 2000, managed by Gail Berman. Another production unit formed was Fox Television Studios Productions (FTSP) under Lisa Berger. Early output by the individual units, or "pods" were FTSP's Son of the Beach for FX, The Hughleys by G-JS and Regency had Malcolm in the Middle.

The pod model evolved into five divisions: alternative, scripted, international, Fox World and Regency Television:
The alternative division was responsible for Talkshow with Spike Feresten and The Wanda Sykes Show, along with E!'s The Girls Next Door franchise. In mid-2002, Fox Alternative Productions was formed by Fox TV Studios and headed by David Martin with its first show to be "The Coach".
The scripted division produced The Shield, along with a number of television films and miniseries.
Fox World division, formed in 2001, produced international versions of its reality television programs such as Joe Millionaire and Temptation Island. The company was shut down by FTVS in 2005.

Eventually the only division operating was the scripted unit. Next FTVS attempted international co-productions of direct-to-series broadcast series. The company had a hit with Burn Notice on USA Network. In August 2010, Dave Madden was appointed to head the unit, where he evenly increased its production slates until he was appointed as president of entertainment for Fox Broadcasting in August 2014.

Fox Television Studios International
This is about the company that exists according to the News Corporation page

Fox Television Studios International was the international division of Fox Television Studios operated in 2000–2001. Daniella Welteke was tapped up to head the division, which was eventually becoming Fox World.

The pod model evolved into five divisions: alternative, scripted, international, Fox World and Regency Television:
The alternative division was responsible for Talkshow with Spike Feresten and The Wanda Sykes Show, along with E!'s The Girls Next Door franchise. In mid-2002, Fox Alternative Productions was formed by Fox TV Studios and headed by David Martin with its first show to be "The Coach".
The scripted division produced The Shield, along with a number of television films and miniseries.
Fox World division, formed in 2001, produced international versions of its reality television programs such as Joe Millionaire and Temptation Island. The company was shut down by FTVS in 2005.

Eventually the only division operating was the scripted unit. Next FTVS attempted international co-productions of direct-to-series broadcast series. The company had a hit with Burn Notice on USA Network. In August 2010, Dave Madden was appointed to head the unit, where he evenly increased its production slates until he was appointed as president of entertainment for Fox Broadcasting in August 2014.

Fox World

Fox World (formerly Fox Television Studios International) was a television production company formed in 2000 as a division of Fox Television Studios (FTVS).  The company produced international versions of its reality television programs such as Joe Millionaire and Temptation Island.

On March 5, 2001, SBS inked a deal/joint venture with Fox World to launch a northern European-based production company.

On November 22, 2004, Hayley Babcock was named senior vice president of production at the Fox World studio, while Daniella Welteke would remain as head of the division.

Fox Lab

Fox Lab was a low-profile production sub-division of 20th Television, originally formed in 1986 as Fox Television Stations Productions (or STF Productions) and was responsible for the development of A Current Affair, Cops and America's Most Wanted. It was rebranded to the current moniker in 1995, although the FTSP label was continued to be used on several older shows until Fox's cancellation of Cops in 2013.

In 1990, Fox Television Stations debuted a soap opera, Tribes, only shown on Fox owned-and-operated stations. It only lasted one season on the air.

By the early 90s, the company was producing a show, Not Just News, for first-run syndication. Also, in 1994, Fox Television Stations Productions produced an international version of America's Most Wanted, Manhunter, to be shown throughout international networks. It was later evolved into a US version for syndication, America's Most Wanted: Final Justice.

In 2003, Fox Lab was producing the syndicated show Classmates, that lasted only two seasons.

Fox Lab's library is currently co-owned by The Walt Disney Company and Fox Corporation.

Foxstar Productions

Foxstar Productions was a division of Fox Television Studios.

The original incarnation of Touchstone Television

The original iteration of Touchstone Television was a television production company founded in 1985 as a division of Disney's subsidiary Touchstone Pictures. It is nowadays known as ABC Signature (since 2020), and was known as ABC Studios since 2007.

Fox 21

Fox 21 (styled fox21.) was a low-cost scripted and reality cable television production arm of 20th Century Fox, which was a division of the Fox Entertainment Group, part of Rupert Murdoch's 21st Century Fox. The company produces, the FX series Sons of Anarchy, Terriers and Tyrant, the A&E action series Breakout Kings, The CW reality series Beauty and the Geek, the Showtime series Homeland, the Comedy Central series Brickleberry, the WGN America series Salem and the Lifetime  series Witches of East End. On December 4, 2014, Fox Television Studios merged with Fox 21 to form Fox 21 Television Studios.

Fox 21 was formed in 2004 by 20th Century Fox Television executives Dana Walden and Gary Newman to develop and back smaller-budgeted but unique and daring shows. Fox 21's first executive was Jane Leisner. The unit's early hits were the FX series Sons of Anarchy and The CW reality series Beauty and the Geek.

After originally being passed over for programming the new network, MyNetworkTV, Fox 21 was in consideration along with Twentieth Television and independent producers as of December 2006 in a potential reprogramming from telenovela to low-cost reality and game shows.

Bert Salke, who moved from his Brancato/Salke production company based at ABC Studios, took charge of the unit in 2010 and led an increase in show productions starting with the Showtime series Homeland. In early 2015, Mythology Entertainment signed a first look deal with the company and its sister studio 20th Century Fox Television while announcing the head of its TV division.

The company produces or had produced the FX series Terriers, Tyrant, Sons of Anarchy, Mayans MC, The Americans and The Bastard Executioner, the A&E action series Breakout Kings, the Showtime series The Chi, the Hulu series Chance, the Comedy Central series Brickleberry, the WGN America series Salem and the Lifetime series Witches of East End.

History

It was announced in December 2014 that Fox 21 and Fox Television Studios would merge into Fox 21 Television Studios. This situation came as a result of FTVS' president David Madden being promoted to Fox Broadcasting Company and the fact that both units were focusing on the same market, cable TV. The combined operation is headed by Fox 21 president Bert Salke.

In January 2020, Fox 21 reached a first-look deal with Marta Kauffman's studio Okay Goodnight, beginning with an adaptation of the 2019 novel The Dreamers. In early-February 2020, it reached a first-look deal with the Gotham Group.

On August 10, 2020, as part of a reorganization of Walt Disney Television following the acquisition of 21st Century Fox by Disney, the studio was renamed Touchstone Television — reviving a brand dormant since the previous Touchstone Television was renamed ABC Studios in 2007. ABC Studios had also merged with the previous iteration of ABC Signature Studios to form the current iteration of ABC Signature. The renamed Touchstone Television studio retains a typewriter-styled logo similar to the previous Fox 21 and Fox 21 Television Studios brandings.

Less than four months following this change, on December 1, 2020, Walt Disney Television head Dana Walden announced a further reorganization which will see the newly renamed division wound up, with Salke transitioning to an overall producing deal with Disney Television Studios, and remaining operations absorbed into 20th Television.

Programming produced

See also 
ABC Signature, formerly known as the original Touchstone Television
Touchstone Pictures, the dormant film studio label and namesake
20th Century Studios (formerly 20th Century Fox)
Fox Television Stations
20th Digital Studio (formerly Zero Day Fox and Fox Digital Studio)

References

External links
Fox Television Studios on 21cf.com

Disney Television Studios
American companies established in 2014
American companies disestablished in 2020
Mass media companies established in 2014
Mass media companies disestablished in 2020
2014 establishments in California
2020 disestablishments in California
Television production companies of the United States
Mass media companies of the United States
Companies based in Los Angeles
Walt Disney Studios (division)
The Walt Disney Company subsidiaries
Disney production studios
Disney acquisitions
Peabody Award winners
20th Television
Former News Corporation subsidiaries